Shenton Avenue is an east-west distributor road in the northern suburbs of Perth, Western Australia, located within the City of Joondalup. The road primarily links Joondalup's coastal suburbs with the Joondalup central business district, which it passes through. It is also an entrance to the Mitchell Freeway.

A portion of Shenton Avenue passes through the main centre of the city of Joondalup, providing quick access to Lakeside Joondalup Shopping City and Joondalup Health Campus. Outside the city centre, Shenton Avenue provides direct access to Currambine Marketplace and Lake Joondalup Baptist College.

History
Shenton Avenue is a dual carriageway for most of its length, changing to two lanes west of Marmion Avenue. A number of major intersections cross the road, most of which are controlled by traffic lights or roundabouts. The most significant intersection is a large two-lane roundabout crossing with Marmion Avenue. The roundabout was constructed shortly after Currambine Marketplace was opened in 1997. New traffic lights were constructed between Shenton Avenue and Grand Boulevard in the late 1990s. More new traffic lights were developed around the mid-2000s, where Shenton Avenue crosses with Pontiac Way and McLarty Avenue.

The road acts as a border between the suburbs of Iluka and Currambine to the north and Ocean Reef and Connolly to the south.

Major intersections

 Lakeside Drive - Joondalup
 Grand Boulevard - Joondalup
  Joondalup Drive (State Route 85) - Joondalup, Edgewater, Carramar, Tapping
  Mitchell Freeway (State Route 2)
 Connolly Drive
  Marmion Avenue (State Route 71) - Connolly, Ocean Reef, Heathridge, Currambine, Iluka
 Ocean Reef Road south / Burns Beach Road north - Ocean Reef, Iluka

References

See also

Roads in Perth, Western Australia
Joondalup
Articles containing video clips